Rebecca Root (born 10 May 1969) is an English actress, comedian and voice coach. She is most well-known for playing the leading role in the 2015 BBC Two sitcom Boy Meets Girl. She is currently performing the role of Siobhan with the National Theatre's touring production of The Curious Incident of the Dog in the Night-Time.

She was rated 18th in The Independent on Sundays Rainbow List 2014, which named her as an openly transgender actress in mainstream television, alongside others like Alexandra Billings, Laverne Cox and Adèle Anderson.

Biography

Root was born in Woking, Surrey, England in 10 May 1969. She is the second child of an auxiliary nurse mother, while her father was a banker in Guildford. She has an older sister called Rachel and a younger sister, Rosalind, who is eight years her junior.

At 11 years old her family moved to rural Oxfordshire where she attended Bartholomew School in Eynsham. As a young person she performed with local drama groups as well as the prestigious National Youth Theatre of Great Britain, where she was a contemporary of actors Lucy Briers, Jonathan Cake, and Daniel Craig.

She went on to graduate from the Royal Central School of Speech and Drama with a Master of Arts in Vocal Studies in 2012. Her thesis, "There and Back Again: Adventures in Genderland", has since been published in the peer reviewed journal Voice and Speech Review.

Career

After finishing her sixth form education in 1987, Root moved to London full time in order to train as an actor at Mountview Academy of Theatre Arts spent the next decade as a jobbing actor, working in a range of television and theatre productions, notably in TV shows like Keeping Up Appearances and Casualty, and stage plays like The Lady's Not For Burning, Hamlet, and Tartuffe.

Before her breakthrough in 2015 playing a supporting role in the award-winning film The Danish Girl (her debut in film) and a lead role in the groundbreaking BBC Two romantic sitcom Boy Meets Girl, Root considered that she played roles described as “a romantic lead, debonair, knight, a soldier—typically and boringly ‘normal.’”

In 2015 Root also starred in the BBC Radio 4 drama 1977, about the transgender popular composer Angela Morley who had become a household name to British radio audiences as Wally Stott. It followed the year in which Morley was enlisted to complete composition of the musical soundtrack to the film Watership Down in three weeks flat. She has appeared in the Doctor Who audio series Stranded, part of the Eighth Doctor's adventures, playing Tania Bell, the Doctor's first openly transgender companion, and an operative of Torchwood monitoring the Eighth Doctor when he is trapped on Earth due to the TARDIS suffering damage.

Root is also a voice coach, teaching at the East 15 Acting School and from her home in Highgate, London. She started that career after she transitioned from male to female in 2003 and acting work became harder to find. Root also advertises voice therapy lessons specifically for transgender people to help them "find a voice they feel fits their gender".

Personal life

Root is a bisexual trans woman and currently resides in London with her partner, actress Elizabeth Menabney.

She is also a passionate advocate for LGBT rights and is patron for the charities Diversity Role Models and Liberate Jersey.

Filmography

References

Further reading 
  – includes an interview with Root.

External links 
 
 

1969 births
21st-century English actresses
Actresses from London
Actresses from Surrey
Alumni of the Royal Central School of Speech and Drama
Bisexual actresses
British vocal coaches
English LGBT actors
Living people
People from Woking
Transgender actresses
Voice teachers
Women music educators